Forum Energy Technologies Forum Energy Technologies is a global oilfield products company that provides products and services to the oil and gas, and renewable industries. 

Forum Energy Technologies was founded in 2010 as a result of the merger of five oilfield products companies: Forum Oilfield Technologies, Triton Group, Subsea Services International, Global Flow Technologies, and Allied Technology.

Triton Group was a UK-based provider of subsea products and services, including remotely operated vehicles (ROVs), intervention tools, and subsea engineering services. Triton Group was formed in 2007 as a result of the merger of Perry Slingsby Systems, Sub-Atlantic, UK Project Support Ltd, and Dynamic Positioning Services Ltd.

Global Flow Technologies was a US-based company that provided flow management products and services, including choke and control valves, flowline products, and flow measurement products.

Allied Technology was a US-based company that provided drilling equipment, including drilling motors, rotary steerable systems, and drilling optimization software.

Forum Oilfield Technologies was originally founded in 2005 as an independent company focused on providing drilling products and services to the oil and gas industry. The company was based in Houston, Texas, and grew quickly through a combination of organic growth and strategic acquisitions.

Today, Forum Energy Technologies' Subsea division provides a range of subsea equipment and services, including ROVs, intervention tooling, subsea structures, pipeline connectors, and survey and positioning equipment. The division operates globally, with locations in the UK, Norway, Singapore, Brazil, and the US.

The company operates globally in multiple business segments related to the energy industry. Forum Energy Technologies is traded on the New York Stock Exchnage (NYSE) under the ticker "FET".

External links
 Forum Energy Technologies
 Company Information (NYSE)
 SEC Filings

References

Companies listed on the New York Stock Exchange
American companies established in 2010
Companies based in Houston
Oilfield services companies
Engineering companies of the United States